Alfredo Arturo Castro Gómez (born 19 December 1955), best known as Alfredo Castro, is a Chilean actor. With a well established trajectory in theater and television, he became one of the most required Latin American film actors of the 2010s.

Personal and early  life 
He grew up in a family of five brothers; his mother died of cancer when he was 10. He attended elementary and middle school at Saint Gabriel de Las Condes, Kent School in Providencia and Liceo de Hombres No. 11 in Las Condes.

He entered the Theater Department of the Faculty of Arts of the University of Chile, where he graduated in acting in 1977. That same year he received the APES Award from the Association of Entertainment Journalists. That same year he debuted in Equus, with good reviews from the specialized press.

Acting career 
Between 1978 and 1981 he worked in Teatro Itinerante, of which he was one of its founders. In 1982 he participates in the production for Televisión Nacional de Chile De cara al mañana, beginning his extensive career on the small screen. He travels to London in 1983, with a scholarship from the British Council to study at The London Academy of Music and Dramatic Arts.

In 1989 he received a scholarship from the Government of France to perfect himself in theater directing in Paris, Strasbourg and Lyon. He returned the same year and founded the Teatro La Memoria company. In 2013 he announced the closure, due to lack of funds, of this theater that operated in Bellavista 503. Before he had notified that he should also end his research center that gave seminars on dramaturgy, directing, acting and writing.

He worked as a teacher and deputy director of the Fernando González Theater Academy.

For the theater of the Catholic University, he staged the plays Theo and Vicente mown by the sun (adaptation of Nous, Theo et Vincent Van Gogh, by Jean Menaud; 1990) and King Lear, with a translation by Nicanor Parra; and in Chile, La Catedral de la Luz (1995), by Pablo Álvarez and Casa de Luna (1997) by Juan Claudio Burgos Droguett, a work inspired by the novel El lugar sinlimites, by José Donoso.

He was president of the Asociación Gremial de Directores de Chile (1997-2000) and artistic director of the Muestra de Dramaturgia organized by the General Secretariat of Government (1999-2000). During that same season, he staged Hechos consumados by Juan Radrigán and Patas de perro, based on the homonymous novel by Carlos Droguett.

He joined Televisión Nacional de Chile in 1998, collaborated closely with director Vicente Sabatini, with several performances in the Golden Age of TV series, achieving great popularity with his roles in La Fiera, Romané, Pampa Ilusión, El Circo de las Montini, Los Pincheira, among others.

In 2001 he directed Las sirvientas (also translated as Las criadas, by Jean Genet) and starred in Copi's Eva Perón, a play that marked his return to the stage as an actor.

In 2004, he directed Claudia Di Girolamo in Sarah Kane's play Psicosis 4:48. The following year, for the play he won an Altazor Award for Best Theater Director and Di Girolamo earned a nomination for Best Actress. theater.

In 2006, Castro is named by Chile Elige as the third best Chilean actor of all time.

He made his film debut in the drama Fuga in 2006 and received critical acclaim for his performance in Tony Manero in 2008. He gained recognition for his subsequent work in roles such as Post Mortem (2010) and No (2012), as well as in leading roles in Desde allá (2015) and The Club (2016), before achieving worldwide recognition at the Venice Film Festival in 2019.

In 2012 he decided to withdraw from the telenovelas with which he became popularly known and to which he dedicated a large part of his life, the last being La Doña.

In 2014, directed the famous play by American playwright Tennessee Williams A Streetcar Named Desire, with a cast headed by Amparo Noguera, Marcelo Alonso, Luis Gnecco and Paloma Moreno.

In 2017 he received the Medal of Honor from the Chilean Chamber of Deputies.

In 2019, Castro received the Starlight International Cinema Award from the Venice International Film Festival for his artistic career.

In March 2020, he was chosen as the best theater actor of the 2010s by El Mercurio.

Selected filmography

Film

Television

References

External links 

1955 births
Living people
Chilean male film actors
Democratic Revolution politicians